= Geusenfriedhof =

Cemetery in Cologne, Germany

Coordinates: 50°55′32″N 6°55′37″E

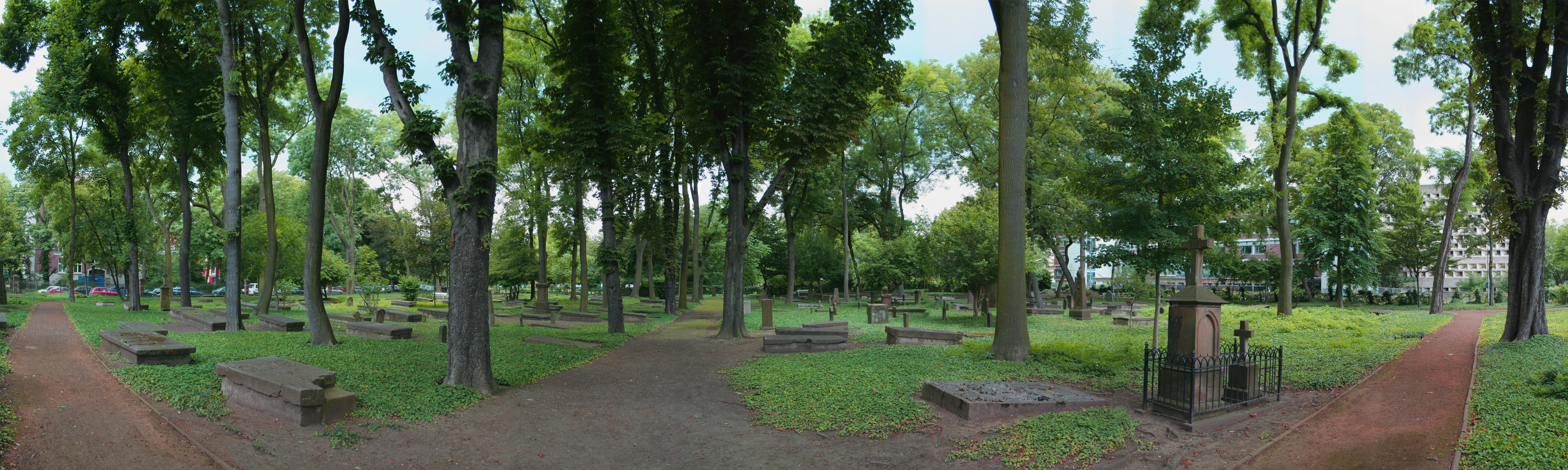
Geusenfriedhof

Geusenfriedhof is a cemetery in Cologne, Germany. It is the oldest Protestant cemetery in the Rhineland, established around 1584.
